Boxee was a cross-platform freeware HTPC (Home Theater PC) software application with a 10-foot user interface and social networking features designed for the living-room TV. It enabled its users to view, rate and recommend content to their friends through many social network services and interactive media related features.

Boxee was originally a fork of the free and open source XBMC (now Kodi) media center software which Boxee used as an application framework for its GUI and media player core platform, together with some custom and proprietary additions.

Marketed as the first ever "Social Media Center", the first public alpha of Boxee was made available on 16 June 2008. The UI design of the Alpha prototype was designed with design firm Method Incorporated, who also created Boxee's brand identity. The first public beta version was officially released for all previously supported platforms on 7 January 2010. Boxee gained the ability to watch live TV on the Boxee Box using a live TV stick in January 2012. By the end of 2012 the developers had discontinued all desktop versions and support.

Boxee co-developed a dedicated set-top box (hardware) called "Boxee Box by D-Link" in cooperation with D-Link which was the first "Powered by Boxee" branded device to be announced and launched, as well as a similar media player device called "Iomega TV with Boxee" (available in the UK & Europe) in cooperation with Iomega and a 46" high-definition television from ViewSonic with integrated Boxee software.

Boxee was owned and developed by a single for-profit startup company, (Boxee, Inc.), which began as a high tech stealth startup based in Israel and the United States with seed money from several angel investors, & was then known to be financially backed by venture capital firms such as General Catalyst Partners, Union Square Ventures, Softbank, Pitango, Spark Capital and Globis Capital Partners. The company's main offices are located at 122 West 26th Street, 8th Floor, New York, NY 10001.

On Wednesday, 3 July 2013 online media sources revealed Samsung would hire key employees and purchase Boxee's assets for around $30M.  Samsung confirmed the acquisition with The New York Times, but did not disclose the amount.

Overview
Boxee supported a wide range of popularly used multimedia formats, and it included features such as playlists, audio visualizations, slideshows, weather forecasts reporting, and an array of third-party plugins. As a media center, Boxee could play most audio and video file containers, as well as display images from many sources, including CD/DVD-ROM drives, USB flash drives, the Internet, and local area network shares.

When run on modern PC hardware, Boxee was able to decode high-definition video up to 1080p. Boxee was able to use DXVA (DirectX Video Acceleration) on Windows Vista and newer Microsoft operating-systems to utilize GPU accelerated video decoding to assist with process of video decoding of high-definition videos.

With its Python-powered plugin system, the Boxee software incorporated features such as Apple movie trailer support and subtitle downloading, access to large on-demand video streaming services Netflix, Headweb and Vudu; a range of popular online internet content channels like audio services Pandora Radio, Last.fm, Jamendo, NPR, SHOUTcast radio streams; video services from ABC, BBC iPlayer, Blip.TV, CNET, CNN, CBS, Comedy Central, Funny or Die, Joost, Major League Baseball, NHL Hockey, MTV Music, MySpaceTV, Revision3, MUBI, OpenFilm, SnagFilms, IndieMoviesOnline, EZTakes, United Football League, Vevo, Vice Magazine, TED, The WB Television Network, YouTube and image services from Flickr and PicasaWeb picture viewing plugins. All were available as media sources available alongside the local library.

Some of the services were via specialized connections (e.g., YouTube), while the rest were a preselected list of podcast channels for streaming using generic RSS web feeds (e.g., BBC News). Boxee also supported NBC Universal's Hulu quite early on, but in February 2009 was asked by Hulu to remove the service at the request of Hulu's content partners. Boxee later reinstated the feature using Hulu's RSS feeds, but Hulu once again blocked access.

Even though both the Boxee App and the Boxee Box supported Netflix, the Boxee App supported only a limited instant queue, missing more recent TV shows and movies available through the web browser and iPhone apps.

In 2009, Boxee introduced a new plugin architecture based on the XUL (XULRunner) framework which technically allows any web-based application to be ported into an application for Boxee integration. Because of this Boxee could utilise Mozilla corebase architecture for most of its plugins – since this is the same core architecture used by Firefox, Hulu saw Boxee as "any other Mozilla browser so Hulu doesn't block the app." Hulu continued to thwart Boxee using strategies like JavaScript scrambling.

Boxee was able to play Adobe Flash content from sites such as YouTube and Hulu, and display HTML5 or Silverlight content from such web-based services such as HBO Go and Netflix. Boxee shipped with a closed source, binary-only, program called "bxflplayer", which was used to load Adobe Flash Player and Microsoft Silverlight proprietary plugins. This program communicated with the main Boxee process via shared memory and rendered the video onto screen. By using this approach, it was possible for Boxee not only to play Flash Video and Silverlight content that was protected by DRM (Digital Rights Management) but also allowed for the user to control the player using a remote control and other input devices that were more suitable to laid back watching. It was not clear if this way of using "bxflplayer" as closed source libraries with a GPL licensed software passes as GPL linking exception or not.

Boxee source code was otherwise in majority based on the XBMC (now Kodi) media center project's source code which Boxee used as its software framework, and the Boxee developers contributed changes to that part back upstream to the XBMC project. So Boxee was partially open-source, and those parts were distributed under the GNU General Public License, however Boxee's social networking layer library, "libboxee" was closed source as it dealt with proprietary methods of communication with Boxee's online back-end server which handled the user account information and social network communications between the users in the Boxee userbase. It is not clear if this way of using closed source libraries with a GPL licensed software passed the GPL linking exception or not.

Features

Social Networking Layers
The social networking component of Boxee was the differentiator from other media center software.

Boxee required registered user accounts, which formed a social network of fellow Boxee users. Users could follow the activity of other Boxee users who were added as friends, and could publicly rate and recommend content.  Users could also control what media appear in the activity feed in order to maintain privacy. If a user recommended something that was freely available from an internet content service then Boxee would let others users stream it directly. If a user recommended something that was not freely available then Boxee would try to show metadata, and movie trailers if it was a movie that the user recommended.

The user's friends' Boxee activity feeds were displayed on the user's home screen, as was the user's own recent activity. Internet content was accessed through a sub-menu of each of the video, audio, and photo menu items, such as Video -> "My videos" and Video -> "Internet videos".

In addition Boxee Beta and later had the option of monitoring Twitter and Facebook news feeds to automatically discover links to videos. Boxee would then add those videos to a watch queue in Boxee so they could be later viewed.

Boxee could also export a user's media activity feed to other social networking services such as FriendFeed, Twitter, and Tumblr. Through FriendFeed, Twitter, and Tumblr it was possible from those third-party social networking services for a user to choose to post the Boxee activity feed to social networking sites such as Facebook, (through FriendFeed, Twitter, and Tumblr apps for Facebook).

Boxee AppBox Add-on Store and plugin Apps (widgets/gadgets)
Boxee's "AppBox" app store "App Store" which was a digital distribution service platform that served add-on apps and plug-ins that provide online content to Boxee, the "AppBox" allowed users to download new apps and addons directly from Boxee's GUI. Many of these sources were in high definition and use streaming sites' native flash and Silverlight players. Boxee had extensibility and integration with online sources for free and premium streaming content.

AppBox offered content including commercial video, educational programming, and media from individuals and small businesses.

Boxee also encouraged users to make and submit their own add-on apps and plug-ins to add additional content accessible from within Boxee.

Audio/video playback and handling
Boxee could play multimedia files from CD/DVD media using the system's DVD-ROM drive, local hard disk drive, or stream them over SMB/SAMBA/CIFS shares, or UPnP (Universal Plug and Play) shares.

Boxee was designed to take advantage of the system's network port if a broadband Internet connection was available, enabling the user to get information from such sites as IMDb, TV.com and AMG.

Boxee could stream Internet-video-streams, and play Internet-radio-stations (such as SHOUTcast). Boxee also included the option to submit music usage statistics to Last.fm and a weather-forecast (via weather.com). It also had music/video-playlist features, picture/image-slideshow functions, an MP3+CDG karaoke function (not available on the Boxee Box) and many audio-visualizations and screensavers.

Boxee could in addition upscale/upconvert all 480p/576p standard-resolution videos and output them to 720p, 1080i, or 1080p HDTV-resolutions.

Boxee could be used to play most common multimedia containers and formats from a local source, (except those protected by those with DRM encryption). It could decode these in software, or optionally pass-through AC3/DTS audio from movies directly to S/PDIF output to an external audio amplifier or receiver for decoding on that device.

Video playback in detail
The Video Library, one of the Boxee metadata databases, was a key feature of Boxee. It allowed for the automatic organization of a users' video content by information associated with the video files (movies and recorded TV Shows) themselves.

The Library Mode view in Boxee allowed a user to browse video content by categories such as Genre, Title, Year, Actors and Director.

Boxee had the capability to on the fly parse and play DVD-Video movies that are stored in ISO and IMG DVD-images, DVD-Video movies that are stored as DVD-Video (IFO/VOB/BUP) files on a hard-drive or network-share, and also ISO and IMG DVD-images directly from RAR and ZIP archives. It also offered software upscaling/upconverting of all DVD-Video movies when outputting them to an HDTV in 720p, 1080i or 1080p.

Audio playback in detail
The Music Library was another key feature of Boxee. It automatically organized the user's music collection by information stored in the music files ID meta tags, such as title, artist, album, genre and popularity.

Boxee featured on-the-fly audio frequency resampling, gapless playback, crossfading, ReplayGain, cue sheet and Ogg Chapter support.

Digital picture/image display in detail
Boxee handled all common digital picture/image formats with the options of panning/zooming and slideshow with "Ken Burns effect", with the use of CxImage open source library code.

BitTorrent client, interface, and torrent trackers
Early builds of Boxee included a built-in BitTorrent client (not in the Windows version), with a frontend for it integrated into the Boxee interface, and there were also Torrent links to legal BitTorrent trackers download sites available incorporated by default. The built-in torrent client was later removed. Through Boxee's Python plugin system it was also possible for the end-users to make their own or add unofficial plugins made by third-party persons for other BitTorrent trackers.

Mobile software associated with Boxee
The "boxee remote") was an application released by Boxee Inc. for the Apple Inc. iOS which allowed for remote controlling of an installed and concurrently-active Boxee session on another computer via the iOS' touchscreen user interface. It was approved for the App Store on 16 March 2010.

Third-party developers also released Boxee remote control apps for Android and webOS.

This is a list of third-party companies who sold hardware bundled with Boxee media center software pre-install, or sold uninstalled systems that specifically claimed to be Boxee-compatible ("Boxee Enabled") by the manufacturer. These third-party companies directly or indirectly helped submit bug fixes back upstream to Boxee, as well as to the XBMC project which Boxee in turn used as its framework.

Boxee Box by D-Link

Boxee Box by D-Link (officially "D-Link Boxee Box DSM-380") was a Linux-based set-top device and media extender that first began shipping in 33 countries worldwide on 10 November 2010. Designed to act as a hub, to bring internet television and other video to the television via Boxee's software, it came pre-installed with Boxee media center software and the hardware was based on Intel CE4110 system-on-a-chip platform (that has a 1.2 GHz Intel Atom CPU with a PowerVR SGX535 Integrated graphics processor), 1 GB of RAM, and 1 GB of NAND Flash Memory. The DSM-380 featured output ports for HDMI (version 1.3), optical digital audio (S/PDIF) connector, and RCA connector for analog stereo audio, two USB ports, an SD card slot, wired 100 Mbit/s (100BASE-T) ethernet, and built-in 802.11n WiFi.

The Boxee Box also shipped with a small two-sided RF remote control with 4-way D-pad navigation and a full QWERTY keypad as standard, and this remote was also sold separately with a USB-receiver as "D-Link Boxee Box Remote DSM-22" which could be used with Boxee installed on a computer so one can use this remote without owning D-Link's Boxee Box The look of both the case and remote prototypes for the Boxee Box were designed by San Francisco-based Astro Studios, the same designer company that designed the look of Xbox 360 and the Microsoft Zune.

Iomega TV with Boxee by Iomega
Iomega TV with Boxee by Iomega was announced by Boxee on 4 January 2011, this was the second Boxee device to be announced It began shipping in Q1 of 2011.

The Iomega TV with Boxee was a Linux device which came pre-installed with Boxee media center software. The hardware was based on Intel CE4110 system-on-a-chip platform (that has a 1.2 GHz Intel Atom CPU with a PowerVR SGX535 Integrated graphics processor), 1 GB of RAM, and 1 GB of NAND Flash Memory. Iomega TV with Boxee features audio / video output ports for HDMI (version 1.3), optical and coaxial digital audio (S/PDIF) connectors, and RCA connector for analog stereo audio, two USB ports, wired 1 Gbit/s ethernet, and built-in 802.11n WiFi.

The Iomega TV with Boxee also shipped with a similar small two-sided RF remote control with 4-way D-pad navigation and full a QWERTY keypad as standard.

However, unlike D-Link's Boxee Box, the Iomega TV with Boxee device featured space to internally fit a 3.5-inch SATA hard drive. According to Boxee, the hard drive was not only for the Boxee software on the device but also usable as a NAS (Network Attached Storage) unit to share its media data over the network as a DLNA compliant UPnP AV media server.

Myka ION
Myka ION was an Nvidia Ion based set-top device designed to bring internet television and media stored on the home network to the living-room, it came pre-installed with Boxee, XBMC, and Hulu Desktop as applications that could be started from the main menu.

NUU Player
NUU Player by NUU Media (NUU Ltd.) was an Nvidia Ion-based set-top device designed to bring internet television and media stored on the home network to the living-room, it came pre-installed with Boxee, Hulu Desktop, and a WebKit web-browser as applications that could be started from the main menu with a remote control. It also had Skype app and Bluetooth support. Nuu has since discontinued NUU Player development and has removed any mention of it from their web site.

Programming and developing
As a partially open source application and freeware software program, Boxee was developed by a commercial start-up company with the goal of someday profiting from Boxee and their social networking service, working as a distribution application framework for both major pay-per-view and independent video on demand providers.

Boxee, like XBMC Media Center (which Boxee is based upon), was a cross-platform software programmed mostly in C++ and used the Simple DirectMedia Layer framework with OpenGL renderer for all versions of Boxee. Some of the libraries that Boxee depended on were also written in the C programming-language, but were used with a C++ wrapper and loaded via Boxee's own DLL loader when used inside Boxee.

Add-on apps (widgets/gadgets) and Python scripts as plugins
Boxee featured a Python Scripts Engine and WindowXML application framework (a XML-based widget toolkit for creating a GUI for widgets) in a similar fashion to Apple Mac OS X Dashboard Widgets and Microsoft Gadgets in Windows Sidebar. Python widget scripts allowed non-developers to themselves create new add-ons functionality to Boxee, (using the easier to learn Python programming language), without knowledge of the complex C/C++ programming language that the rest of the Boxee software was written in. plugin scripts add-ons included functions like Internet-TV and movie-trailer browsers, cinema guides, Internet-radio-station browsers (example SHOUTcast), and much more.

Boxee also introduced an additional plugin architecture based on the XUL (XULRunner) framework which enables any web-based application to be integrated into Boxee as an app add-on. With this new plugin architecture Boxee used Mozilla corebase architecture for those plugins.  Since this was the same core architecture that Firefox uses, Hulu will see Boxee as any other Mozilla-based web browser.

Skins, skinning, and the skinning-engine
Boxee GUI source code was based on XBMC Media Center which was noted for having a very flexible GUI toolkit and robust framework for its GUI, using a standard XML base, making theme-skinning and personal customization very accessible. Users can create their own skin (or simply modify an existing skin) and share it with others via public websites dedicated for XBMC skins trading.

Reception
In October 2008, Boxee won Consumer Electronics Association's (CEA) i-Stage award, and with it $50,000 prize for the continued development of Boxee, as well as a free booth for the 2009 International CES (Consumer Electronics Show). Boxee donated half of the $50,000 prize money to the developers of XBMC.

On 9 January 2009, G4 announced Boxee as the winner of their "Best of the Best products of CES 2009" award (in the "Maximum Tech" category) amongst all the products displayed at CES (Consumer Electronics Show) 2009 trade show.

In January 2010, at the Consumer Electronics Show, Boxee garnered 5 awards; "LAPTOP's Best of CES 2010 – Best Home Entertainment (Boxee Box)", "Last Gadget Standing – CES 2010 Winner", "''International CES Best of Innovations 210 – Home Theater Accessories", "Popular Science – Best of CES 2010 (Products of the Future)".

In April 2011, it was made public that Boxee had violated the terms of the GPL in the way they used open source software.  According to the GPLv3, which governed software in the firmware of the device, users need to be able to reinstall modifications to the device.  Boxee admitted the software was included in each device, but stated that their financial agreements with other companies were at risk if they complied.  Despite much user dismay there was no change in course by Boxee.

On 31 October 2012 Boxee posted a statement on their website saying they had to make a decision between releasing a device which was hackable, or one which was commercially viable with premium content.

As it stated, Boxee would have loved for the Boxee Box to be open to other software, but ultimately, they were bound by agreements with their content providers to ensure the security of the content. This started a spate of negative comments from Boxee Box users on the Boxee blog as prior Boxee promises had indicated otherwise. After less than a day, the entire Boxee page (along with the statement, the blog and its comments) was removed and replaced with a new Boxee TV website. However, the old Boxee blog was not deleted but moved.

See also
Comparison of media players
Interactive television
List of free television software
Smart TV
Web television

References

External links
  (www.boxee.tv now links to and redirects to a New York Times article on its acquisition by samsung)

Free multimedia software
Free media players
Free video software
Free software programmed in C++
Free television software
MacOS media players
Software DVD players
Windows media players
Digital television
Streaming television
Software forks
Online companies of Israel
Software that uses XUL